Kaibun is a Japanese equivalent of the palindrome, or in other words, a sentence that reads the same from the beginning to the end or from the end to the beginning. The unit of kaibun is mora, since the Japanese language uses syllabaries, hiragana and katakana.

Single word palindromes are not uncommon in Japanese. For example, Ku-ku (九九, multiplication table), Shi-n-bu-n-shi (新聞紙, newspaper), to-ma-to (トマト, tomato), etc. So kaibun usually refers to a palindromic sentence, but a passage can be a kaibun too.

The topic marker "wa" (は) can be treated as "ha" and small kana ゃ,ゅ and ょ are usually allowed to be interpreted as big kana や, ゆ and よ. In classics, diacritic marks are often ignored.

Rather than saying "read the same forwards and backwards", because Japanese is traditionally written vertically, Japanese people describe the word as being the same when read from the top (ue kara yomu) as when read from the bottom (shita kara yomu).

Famous kaibun

Ta-ke-ya-bu ya-ke-ta (竹薮焼けた) - A bamboo grove has been burned.
Wa-ta-shi ma-ke-ma-shi-ta-wa (私負けましたわ) - I have lost.
Na-ru-to wo to-ru-na (なるとを取るな) - Do not take my naruto (spiral-shaped fishcake).
Shi-na-mo-n pa-n mo re-mo-n pa-n mo na-shi (シナモンパンもレモンパンも無し) - There is neither cinnamon bread nor lemon bread.
Na-ga-ki yo-no to-ho-no ne-bu-ri-no mi-na me-za-me na-mi-no-ri-bu-ne-no o-to-no-yo-ki-ka-na (長き世の 遠の眠りの 皆目覚め 波乗り船の 音の良きかな) Tanka - Everybody gets awakened from a long sleep and enjoys the sound of waves on which the boat is gliding along.
Yo-no-na-ka, ho-ka-ho-ka na-no-yo (世の中、ホカホカなのよ) - The world is a warm place.

External links
 

Japanese word games
Palindromes

ja:回文